The 2005 World Wrestling Championships were held at the László Papp Budapest Sports Arena in Budapest, Hungary. The event took place from September 26 to October 2, 2005.

Medal table

Team ranking

Medal summary

Men's freestyle

Men's Greco-Roman

Women's freestyle

Participating nations
621 competitors from 81 nations participated.

 (1)
 (1)
 (11)
 (4)
 (5)
 (10)
 (20)
 (2)
 (4)
 (14)
 (14)
 (1)
 (1)
 (20)
 (2)
 (1)
 (13)
 (1)
 (6)
 (2)
 (3)
 (5)
 (4)
 (8)
 (12)
 (15)
 (20)
 (4)
 (16)
 (3)
 (21)
 (18)
 (14)
 (3)
 (6)
 (14)
 (21)
 (16)
 (15)
 (3)
 (6)
 (9)
 (1)
 (1)
 (1)
 (6)
 (14)
 (2)
 (4)
 (1)
 (4)
 (6)
 (1)
 (1)
 (1)
 (16)
 (2)
 (5)
 (5)
 (17)
 (21)
 (3)
 (7)
 (2)
 (1)
 (14)
 (9)
 (3)
 (7)
 (6)
 (3)
 (1)
 (1)
 (2)
 (18)
 (1)
 (21)
 (1)
 (21)
 (13)
 (9)

References
 Themat.com

External links
UWW Database
Official website

 
W
W
World Wrestling Championships
International wrestling competitions hosted by Hungary